Borrowed Finery is a 1925 American silent drama film produced and released by Tiffany Pictures, and based on a story by George Bronson Howard. Veteran director and performer Oscar Apfel directed a cast that includes Louise Lorraine, Hedda Hopper, Lou Tellegen, and Ward Crane.

Plot
As described in a film magazine review, a mannequin borrows an evening gown from the firm that employs her and ruins it at a party. Then she resigns her position and falls into the hands of an impostor who claims to be a secret service agent. He demands that she obtain from a wealthy woman some jewels on which he insists no duty was paid. She obeys, and then learns from a genuine secret service operative that she has been duped. Together they trap the impostor and, after he is locked up, they make their wedding plans.

Cast

Preservation
This film was considered a lost film. In late 2016 Czech National Film Archive announced rediscovery of film reels.

See also
List of rediscovered films

References

External links

Lobby card
Lantern slide (archived)

1925 films
1925 drama films
Silent American drama films
American silent feature films
American black-and-white films
Films directed by Oscar Apfel
1920s rediscovered films
Tiffany Pictures films
Rediscovered American films
1920s American films